Daniel Chicoine (born November 30, 1957) is a Canadian retired professional ice hockey forward who played 31 games in the National Hockey League for the Cleveland Barons and Minnesota North Stars between 1977 and 1980.

Career statistics

Regular season and playoffs

International

External links

1957 births
Living people
Canadian ice hockey forwards
Cleveland Barons (NHL) draft picks
Cleveland Barons (NHL) players
Ice hockey people from Quebec
Minnesota North Stars players
New Haven Nighthawks players
Oklahoma City Stars players
Phoenix Roadrunners (CHL) players
Quebec Nordiques (WHA) draft picks
Sherbrooke Castors players
Sherbrooke Jets players
Sportspeople from Sherbrooke